Thomas Tebbich (born 4 February 1975 in Graz, Styria) is a retired decathlete from Austria. He set his personal best score (8039 points) on 30 May 1999 in Götzis. He is a three-time national outdoor champion in the men's decathlon and one-time the men's pole vault (2004).

Achievements

References

national statistics

1975 births
Living people
Austrian decathletes
Austrian male pole vaulters
Sportspeople from Graz